Matthew Yohannes Johnson (born October 21, 1992),  known professionally as Matt U Johnson, is an American rapper, singer, and songwriter from El Paso, Texas. He released his first single, Get Up feat. Treyy G, in March 2018.He is best known for his single Pon Fire feat Snoop Dogg & Karl Wolf released in 2021. In October 2022, he released the remix to the song which gained him local attention.

Career
Matthew Johnson was born in Staten Island, New York. One of his first performances was at the Neon Desert Music Festival in El Paso in 2018.In 2020, he received local attention for his single Gwan Get it feat. Choclair & Sito Rocks.

Discography

Singles

References

Further reading
 El Paso Times
 Texas Music Office

External links
Matt U Johnson Official Instagram

1992 births
Living people
Musicians from Texas